Halvor Olai Møgster (21 December 1875 – 22 February 1950) was a Norwegian sailor who competed in the 1920 Summer Olympics. He was a crew member of the Norwegian boat Atlanta, which won the gold medal in the 12 metre class (1907 rating).

References

1875 births
1950 deaths
Norwegian male sailors (sport)
Sailors at the 1920 Summer Olympics – 12 Metre
Olympic sailors of Norway
Olympic gold medalists for Norway
Olympic medalists in sailing
Medalists at the 1920 Summer Olympics